World Sinfonia is an album by jazz fusion guitarist Al Di Meola that was released in 1991.

Track listing
 "Perpetual Emotion " (Al Di Meola) – 3:30
 "Orient Blue" (Di Meola) – 2:57
 "Tango Suite Part I" (Ástor Piazzolla) – 8:49
 "Tango Suite Part III" (Piazzolla) – 8:50
 "Falling Grace" (Steve Swallow) – 4:21
 "Last Tango for Astor" (Di Meola) – 6:20
 "No Mystery" (Chick Corea) – 12:37
 "Lustrine" (Dino Saluzzi) – 9:12
 "Little Cathedral" (Di Meola, Augustin Barrios) – 1:45
 "La Cathedral" (Barrios) – 4:37

Personnel
 Al Di Meola – guitars, percussion
 Chris Carrington – guitars
 Dino Saluzzi – bandoneón
 Gumbi Oritz – percussion, conga
 Arto Tunçboyacıyan – percussion, vocals

Charts

References

External links
Al Di Meola discography

1991 albums
Al Di Meola albums
Tomato Records albums